Alteribacillus  is a genus of bacteria from the family Bacillaceae.

References

Further reading 
 
 

 

Bacillaceae
Bacteria genera